Nam-myeon (South Township) is a rural city in Jeongseon County, Gangwon-do located between Gohan-eup and Jeongseon-eup.

Education
There are 2 small schools in Nam-myeon.
Namseon Elementary School (남선초등학교)
Moongok Middle School (문곡중학교)

Attractions
High Resort 1, a ski resort, is located nearby in Gohan-eup, Gangwonland.

See also
 Geography of South Korea

References

External links
Nam Town Office website 

Towns and townships in Gangwon Province, South Korea
Jeongseon County